Piano á la Mode is an album by American jazz pianist Randy Weston which was recorded in 1957 and released on the Jubilee label.

Reception

Allmusic awarded the album 4 stars.

Track listing 
All compositions by Randy Weston except as indicated
 "Earth Birth" - 5:10  
 "Nobody Knows the Trouble I've Seen" (Traditional) - 3:14
 "Saucer Eyes" - 4:18  
 "I Got Rhythm" (George Gershwin, Ira Gershwin) - 5:20
 "Gingerbread" - 2:54   
 "Cocktails for Two" (Sam Coslow, Arthur Johnston) - 3:35
 "Honeysuckle Rose" (Andy Razaf, Fats Waller) - 6:26
 "FE-Double-U-Blues" - 5:34

Personnel
Randy Weston - piano 
John A. "Peck" Morrison - bass 
Connie Kay - drums

References 

Randy Weston albums
1957 albums
Jubilee Records albums